Hadapsar railway station is located in Hadapsar, a suburb of Pune in Maharashtra. There is also plan to start suburban trains on Pune–Daund section. This station will be a major station for Pune–Daund suburban trains.

Upgrade plans
The central railways has plans for land acquisition near this station. Plans are to increase parking space, approach roads to the station, passenger lounges and other facilities. The proposal includes adding 40 acres of land adjacent to the station for construction of dedicated parking, station building which will include lounges, reservation center, waiting rooms etc. Some of these can originate and terminate at Hadapsar which will reduce load on Pune Junction. Approximately  400 crores are required for land acquisition and  350 crores are require for actual development of this station.

Trains
 Pune–Baramati Passenger
 Pune–Baramati–Daund–Pune Passenger
 Pune–Daund Passenger
 Pune–Daund Passenger
 Pune–Daund Fast Passenger
 Pune–Manmad Passenger
 Pune–Nizamabad Passenger
 Pune–Solapur Passenger
 Pune–Solapur Passenger
 Hadapsar(HDP)-Hydrabad(HYB) Express Via Latur
 Hadapsar-Nanded Express

See also
 
 
 
 Pune Suburban Railway

References

Railway stations in Pune